"Jungle" is a song by Australian singer Emma Louise, which was uploaded on Triple J Unearthed website on 5 March 2011 before being released officially on 31 March 2011 as the lead single from Emma Louise's second EP Full Hearts & Empty Rooms. The music video was released on 23 May 2011.

At the Queensland Music Awards of 2011, "Jungle" won Song of the Year.

The song gained international success with a remix by German DJ Wankelmut, retitled "My Head Is a Jungle" in January 2013. Emma Louise's solo version has charted in its own right in a number of countries, most notably peaking number 3 on the French Singles Chart. After the success of the Wankelmut remix, Emma Louise included both versions on the European edition of her 2013 studio album vs Head vs Heart. 

The song was used in Season 1 Episode 9 of Australian prison drama Wentworth. It was also used in Season 8 Episode 2 of Grey's Anatomy.

In January 2022, the song went viral on TikTok as part of the "My Head Is A Jungle" trend, almost 11 years since the release of the original version and 9 years since the Wankelmut remix was released.

Music video
In the music video for "Jungle", Emma Louise sings the song stuck in a dark room with light bulbs hanging from the ceiling. In between cutouts, she is there reading a book and opening a suitcase in the attic. The length of the video is 3 minutes and 23 seconds. An edit of the same video was made for the Wankelmut remix at a length of 3 minutes and 33 seconds.

Track listings
Digital download
 "Jungle" - 3:22

Digital download
 "Jungle" (Arundel Remix) - 4:52

Charts

Weekly charts

Year-end charts

References

Emma Louise songs
2011 singles
2011 songs